Rognvald Andrew Mathewson (19 February 1944 – 3 December 2020) was a British jazz double bassist and bass guitarist. During his career, Mathewson performed with Ronnie Scott, but also recorded with Stan Getz, Joe Henderson, Joan Armatrading, Ben Webster, Philly Joe Jones, Roy Eldridge, Oscar Peterson and Bill Evans.

Biography
Mathewson was born in Lerwick, Shetland Islands, into an unusually musical household. At eight years old he was studying classical piano. He continued to study and perform classical piano until he reached sixteen, having started playing bass guitar a year earlier.  His talent was noted and encouraged by the Shetland musician, Peerie Willie Johnson.

In 1962, Mathewson was in Germany, playing professionally with a band that played Dixieland music. In London, he also performed with various jazz and R&B bands throughout the early 1960s. Around this time he was also a member of The Kenny Clarke-Francy Boland Big Band. In 1966, Mathewson became a member of the Tubby Hayes band, with which he performed until 1973. From 1975 on in to the 1990s, he was frequently a participant in Ronnie Scott's recordings and concerts. In 1983, he appeared on his old friend Dick Morrissey's solo album, After Dark, with Jim Mullen, John Critchinson, Martin Drew and Barry Whitworth.

On 11 February 2007, a benefit concert was held for Mathewson, who was reportedly recovering from two broken hips, a broken wrist and a ruptured artery.

The newsletter of the Vortex Jazz club reported on 4 December 2020, that Mathewson died the day before after suffering from COVID-19 during the COVID-19 pandemic in England.

Discography
With Tubby Hayes
 For Members Only (Live) (Miles Music)
 Mexican Green (Fontana)
With Philly Joe Jones
 Trailways Express (Black Lion, 1968 [1971])
With John Taylor
 Reverie (Vinyl Records)

With Gordon Beck
 Seven Steps to Evans w/ Tony Oxley & Kenny Wheeler (MPS)
 All in the Morning (Jaguar)
 Jazz Trio (Musica)
 Gordon Beck's Gyroscope: One, Two, Three....Go! (Jaguar)

With Ronnie Scott
 Live At Ronnie Scott's (CBS)
 Serious Gold (Pye)

With Phil Woods and His European Rhythm Machine
 Live at Montreux 72 (Les Disques Pierre Cardin)

With John Stevens
 Blue (Culture Press)

With Terry Smith
 Fall Out (Philips)

With Kenny Clarke
 Rue Chaptal (MPS)

With Kenny Wheeler
 Song for Someone (Incus, 1973)

With Acoustic Alchemy
 Early Alchemy (GRP)

With Ian Carr
 Solar Plexus (Vertigo)

With the Spontaneous Music Ensemble
 The Source: From and Towards (Tangent)
 Live Big Band and Quartet (Vinyl)

With The Chitinous Ensemble Chitinous (Deram)With Stan Sulzmann On Loan with Gratitude (Mosaic)

With Rollercoaster
 Wonderin' (1980)

With Ray Nance
 Huffin'n'Puffin' (1971)

With Charles Tolliver
 Impact'' (Enja, 1972)

References

External links
 
 
 "Ron Mathewson - Shetland's forgotten genius of the double bass", Tom Morton's Beatcroft, 11 November 2008

1944 births
2020 deaths
Male double-bassists
Scottish jazz bass guitarists
Scottish jazz double-bassists
People from Lerwick
Shetland music
Nucleus (band) members
21st-century double-bassists
21st-century British male musicians
British male jazz musicians
Kenny Clarke/Francy Boland Big Band members
Deaths from the COVID-19 pandemic in England